The 1955–56 Fort Wayne Pistons season was the eighth season for the Pistons in the National Basketball Association (NBA) and 15th season as a franchise. 

The Pistons would finish with a 37-35 (.514) record, 1st in the NBA Western Division and the only division team above .500 on the season.  In the Western Division Finals the Pistons defeated the St. Louis Hawks in a best-of-five series 3–2 to reach the NBA Finals for the second straight season.  They would go on to lose the Finals in five games to the Philadelphia Warriors.  The team was led by forward Mel Hutchins (12.0 ppg, 7. rpg, NBA All-Star), forward George Yardley (17.4 ppg, 9.7 rpg, NBA All-Star) and center Larry Foust (16.2 ppg, 9.0 rpg, NBA All-Star). 

The Pistons also drafted their first black player in the team's history, Jesse Arnelle out of Penn State in the 2nd round  of the 1955 NBA Draft.  Arnelle initially refused to sign with Fort Wayne, playing for the Harlem Globetrotters, but signed with the Pistons after the conclusion of the Globetrotters European tour, played in 31 games, averaging 4.7 ppg and 5.5 rpg, before breaking his nose in February to end the season.  Arnelle did not return to Fort Wayne the following season, ending his professional basketball career.  He became a successful lawyer and would serve on the Penn State Board of Trustees.

Regular season

Season standings

x – clinched playoff spot

Record vs. opponents

Game log

Playoffs

|- align="center" bgcolor="#ffcccc"
| 1
| March 22
| St. Louis
| L 85–86
| George Yardley (23)
| War Memorial Coliseum
| 0–1
|- align="center" bgcolor="#ffcccc"
| 2
| March 24
| @ St. Louis
| L 74–84
| Larry Foust (16)
| Kiel Auditorium
| 0–2
|- align="center" bgcolor="#ccffcc"
| 3
| March 25
| St. Louis
| W 107–84
| Houbregs, Yardley (19)
| War Memorial Coliseum
| 1–2
|- align="center" bgcolor="#ccffcc"
| 4
| March 27
| @ St. Louis
| W 93–84
| George Yardley (30)
| Kiel Auditorium
| 2–2
|- align="center" bgcolor="#ccffcc"
| 5
| March 29
| St. Louis
| W 102–97
| Foust, Yardley (20)
| War Memorial Coliseum
| 3–2
|-

|- align="center" bgcolor="#ffcccc"
| 1
| March 31
| @ Philadelphia
| L 94–98
| George Yardley (27)
| George Yardley (15)
| Hutchins, Phillip (6)
| Philadelphia Civic Center4,128
| 0–1
|- align="center" bgcolor="#ccffcc"
| 2
| April 1
| Philadelphia
| W 84–83
| George Yardley (30)
| George Yardley (19)
| Andy Phillip (5)
| War Memorial Coliseum6,976
| 1–1
|- align="center" bgcolor="#ffcccc"
| 3
| April 3
| @ Philadelphia
| L 96–100
| Larry Foust (19)
| Larry Foust (14)
| Chuck Noble (4)
| Philadelphia Civic Center11,698
| 1–2
|- align="center" bgcolor="#ffcccc"
| 4
| April 5
| Philadelphia
| L 105–107
| George Yardley (21)
| Larry Foust (14)
| Andy Phillip (6)
| War Memorial Coliseum7,852
| 1–3
|- align="center" bgcolor="#ffcccc"
| 5
| April 7
| @ Philadelphia
| L 88–99
| George Yardley (30)
| George Yardley (20)
| Corky Devlin (6)
| Philadelphia Civic Center11,194
| 1–4
|-

References

Detroit Pistons seasons
Fort Wayne